Sensus divinitatis (Latin for "sense of divinity"), also referred to as sensus deitatis ("sense of deity") or semen religionis ("seed of religion"), is a term first used by French Protestant reformer John Calvin to describe a postulated human sense. Instead of knowledge of the environment (as with, for example, smell or sight), the sensus divinitatis is alleged to give humans a knowledge of God.

History 
In Calvin's view, there is no reasonable non-belief:

Jonathan Edwards, the 18th-century American Calvinist preacher and theologian, claimed that while every human being has been granted the capacity to know God, successful use of these capacities requires an attitude of "true benevolence".

Neo-Calvinists who adhere to the presuppositionalist school of Christian apologetics sometimes appeal to a sensus divinitatis to argue that there are no genuine atheists.

Analytic philosopher Alvin Plantinga of the University of Notre Dame posits a modified form of the sensus divinitatis in his Reformed epistemology whereby all have the sense, only it does not work properly in some humans, due to sin's noetic effects.

Roman Catholic theologian Karl Rahner proposed an innate sense or pre-apprehension of God, which has been noted to share elements in common with Calvin's Sensus Divinitatis.

This concept of innate knowledge of God is similar to the Islamic concept of Fitra.

Criticism

Philosopher Evan Fales presents three arguments against the presence of a sensus divinitatis:

 The divergence of claims and beliefs (lack of reliability, even within Christian sects).
 The lack of demonstrably superior morality of Christians versus non-Christians.
 Bible verses, accepted by most Christians as authored by men inspired by the Holy Spirit—presumably with a functioning sensus divinitatis—in which "God performs, commands, accepts or countenances rape, genocide, human sacrifice, pestilence to punish David for taking a census, killing David's infant to punish him, hatred of family, capital punishment for breaking a monetary promise, and so on".

Philosopher Steven Maitzen claimed in 2006 that the demographics of religious belief make the existence of the sensus divinitatis unlikely, as this sense appears so unevenly distributed.

Hans Van Eyghen argues that the phenomenological description of the sensus divinitatis does not match what the cognitive sciences show about religious belief.

However, Maitzen may have confused Aquinas's sensus dei with sensus divinitatis—sensus divinitatis (a religious sense) only necessitates a core religious/faith component to one's beliefs, whereas the sensus dei aims at a natural knowledge of God—compare In the Twilight of Western Thought by Herman Dooyeweerd (1894–1977).

References 

Religious philosophical concepts
Calvinist theology
Latin philosophical phrases